ISUP may refer to:

Paris Institute of Statistics, a school for statistics in France
ISDN User Part or ISUP, a feature of Public Switched Telephone Networks
Inflatable Stand Up Paddle Board or iSUP, a water craft for the sport of Stand Up Paddling that is inflated rather than having a solid construction.

fr:ISUP